This list presents an overview of railway track gauges by size. A gauge is measured between the inner faces of the rails.

Track gauges by size

Minimum and ridable miniature railways

For ridable miniature railways and minimum gauge railways, the gauges are overlapping. There are also some extreme narrow gauge railways listed. See: Distinction between a ridable miniature railway and a minimum gauge railway for clarification.

Model railway gauges are covered in rail transport modelling scales.

Narrow gauge

Standard gauge:

Broad gauge

See also

 List of tram track gauges
 Loading gauge
 Minimum-gauge railway
 Rail transport
 Rapid transit track gauge

References

External links
 Jane's World Railways
  site
 The Indian Railways FAQ: Gauges
 Extensive list of 2 ft gauge railways worldwide

 List of track gauges
Track